The United States of Leland is a 2003 American drama film written and directed by Matthew Ryan Hoge that follows a meek teenage boy, the eponymous Leland, who has inexplicably committed a shocking murder. In the wake of the killing, his teacher in prison tries to understand the senseless crime, while the families of the victim and the perpetrator struggle to cope with the aftermath.

Plot
The film begins with a flashback narrated by Leland P. Fitzgerald, describing how he could not remember the details of the day that he killed an intellectually disabled boy named Ryan Pollard. Leland is arrested. Ryan's parents, Harry and Karen, sisters Becky and Julie, and Julie's live-in boyfriend Allen grieve the loss of their loved one. Leland's divorced mother, Marybeth, is desperate to see her son, while his father, famous writer Albert Fitzgerald, discovers his son's fate in a newspaper and returns home to be there for the trial.

While in juvenile hall, Leland is schooled by teacher Pearl Madison, an aspiring writer who is searching for a breakthrough story. Like many others at the detention center, Pearl senses something is different about the emotionally detached Leland, and helps him circumvent the prison rules so he can keep a journal. While his girlfriend is out of town in Los Angeles, Pearl sleeps with a coworker and tells her that he is going to write a book about Leland.

Through his discussions with Pearl, Leland reveals his childhood memories such as his grandmother's funeral and traveling long distances to visit his father. One time, he decided to stay in New York rather than continue on to see his father. After he could not find a hotel, a kindhearted family, the Calderons, decided to take him in for his stay. He continued to visit the family over the years, and was especially captivated by Mrs. Calderon. The two also discuss Leland's history with Becky, Ryan's sister. He had met her innocently at a record store and begun regularly walking home with Ryan and her after school. They had grown to love each other, and Leland recalled a time when Becky asked him to promise her "everything's gonna be okay", despite his objections that he had no control over bad things that could happen. As she explained, sometimes it is just nice to hear things one hopes to be true.

Pearl covertly arranges a meeting with Leland's father at his hotel. After he asks for more information on his family's past, Albert realizes Pearl is researching for his book and refuses to let his son be exploited - something of which he is guilty himself. He eventually tells the prison supervisor about Pearl's prohibited meetings with Leland, leading him to be reassigned to another section of the prison.

Leland discovers through Allen that Becky had an affair with a drug dealer named Kevin who is due to be released from prison. After he gets out of prison, Becky starts to see Kevin again and decides to break up with Leland. In a rare display of emotion, he argues with her, but ultimately realizes the futility of anything he can do or say to change her mind, saying that neither the tears nor the amount of his love - he says he still dreams about her - can change the fact that she does not love him in return. Pearl says he should be angry with her since she betrayed him. Leland replies that he is sad, but not angry.

Pearl begins to realize the implications of his sexual indiscretion through his discussions with Leland, and admits his own failings. Eventually, his girlfriend discovers his tryst and they have a fight over the phone. Meanwhile, Julie decides to break up with Allen and does not want to go to college with him. Brokenhearted, he holds up an auto repair shop and allows himself to be arrested in front of Julie. He is sent to the same juvenile hall as Leland, where he steals a knife (from Pearl) and kills Leland in the prison yard as revenge for what he had done to the Pollard family.

Pearl flies to LA to reconcile with his girlfriend and reads Leland's final entries in his journal. On one of his return trips to New York, Leland had discovered that Mrs. Calderon had divorced her husband and that the spark for life that she had before was gone; it is implied Leland and Mrs. Calderon had slept together. Afterwards, Leland writes, he begins noticing a sadness in everyone around him, driving him into a deep depression. He focused on Ryan, who he realized probably wouldn't know true happiness or love in ways other people took for granted. One day, as he walks Ryan home from school, the boy becomes frustrated with an obstacle on the bike path. Leland helps him off his bike, gives him a hug, and whispers in his ear that "everything is going to be okay".  Leland wanted to stop the sadness.  He could not return the spark to Mrs. Calderon but he could end the sadness of a boy who was disabled so that people would not look at him like he would never be normal.  By killing Ryan, Leland could stop his sadness.

Cast

Production 
Of his decision to do the film, Ryan Gosling said, "I wanted to do [the movie] so badly because I felt like Leland was so different. It's this kind of character that's not in movies very often – characters that are emotionally disconnected for the whole film – so it's a tricky thing to tap into."

Reception
On Rotten Tomatoes, the film has a 34% rating based on reviews from 94 critics, with an average rating of 4.9/10. The site's consensus reads that "The United States of Leland has its moments, but they're undermined by a muddled plot, unsympathetic characters, and frustratingly uneven performances." 

Roger Ebert, writing for the Chicago Sun-Times, declared the film a "moral muddle". Writing for Variety, David Rooney wrote, "Laboring against characters that spout artificial, platitudinous dialogue, the cast invites little sympathy. Gosling’s one-note, blankly disturbed act has none of the magnetic edge of his breakthrough work in 'The Believer,' while the intriguing ambiguity of Cheadle’s character could have been far more interestingly explored." Owen Gleiberman of Entertainment Weekly called the film "yet another joylessly trendy indie portrait of the dark side of suburbia."

References

External links
 
 
 
 

2003 films
2003 drama films
American independent films
2003 independent films
American drama films
American coming-of-age drama films
Films about dysfunctional families
Films about educators
Films shot in Los Angeles
American prison films
Films about murder
Paramount Vantage films
2000s English-language films
2000s American films
Films about disability